Harald Hoyer is a computer programmer and photographer, best known for developing the dracut initramfs generator and framework, the udev device manager of Linux, the systemd replacement for the System V init daemon and the Gummiboot EFI boot loader. Harald Hoyer also made various contributions to the Linux Kernel, starting 1997.

He is employed by Red Hat, Inc.

Harald Hoyer resides in Vaterstetten, Germany.

References 

Free software programmers
Living people
1971 births
Red Hat employees